The China Plate is a 1931 Silly Symphonies animated film.

Plot
The short is based on the Willow pattern legend, with some major differences, including a dragon. There is an oriental scene, the Willow pattern on a china plate, that comes to life, telling the story of two young lovers who are disturbed. First, they have to deal with an angry and overweight Emperor who is the girl's father. He chases after them because the boy disturbed his rest and disapproves of him near his daughter. The two children are then chased by a fire-breathing dragon that eats the emperor (he thought the dragon's open mouth was a cave entrance).

Reception
The Film Daily (June 14, 1931): "Entertainment for both juvenile and adult audiences is to be found in this Walt Disney Silly Symphony. Novelty rather than humor is the keynote. It's real and different entertainment all the way."

Variety (June 30, 1931): "The biggest arena of 'em all the Roxy Theatre has gone cartoon for the last couple of shows. Pen and ink reels aren't being restricted to the supper hour, but are flashing at the deluxe performances right after the newsreel. So far the house has been giving the Disney drawings the break. This is another from that source and good enough to fit any big house layout. This one carries the familiar musical synchronization while unfolding a couple of amusing twists... Short is notable for the absence of dialog. Just sound effects, and it's better this way."

Home media
The short was released on December 4, 2001, on Walt Disney Treasures: Silly Symphonies - The Historic Musical Animated Classics.

References

External links
 

1931 films
1931 short films
1930s Disney animated short films
Films directed by Wilfred Jackson
Films produced by Walt Disney
Silly Symphonies
1931 animated films
Films set in China
Films based on Chinese myths and legends
Films scored by Frank Churchill
American black-and-white films
Animated films about dragons
Columbia Pictures animated short films
Columbia Pictures short films
Animated films without speech
1930s American films